Perfect Master is the English term Meher Baba began to use in his writing as early as 1925 to denote the Eastern idea of a sadguru (Vedanta) or a qutub (Sufism). A Perfect Master, according to Baba, is a God-realized person (one whose limited individualized consciousness has merged with God) who can use his Divine attributes of Infinite Power, Knowledge and Bliss for the spiritual upliftment of others. In describing Meher Baba's specialized use of the term Charles Purdom writes, "The title ‘Perfect Master’... means one who has himself reached the goal to which he directs others: one who, pointing to God, has himself realized God."

States of God-realized souls 
Meher Baba stated in his book God Speaks that when a spiritually advanced soul loses its consciousness as a separate being, it merges in God in one of three distinct states:
 The soul becomes conscious of itself as God and enjoys eternally His divine attributes of Infinite Power, Knowledge and Bliss, but remains completely unconscious of Creation.
 The soul becomes conscious of itself as God and retains consciousness of Creation but does not use His divine attributes in it.
 The soul becomes conscious of itself as God and uses His divine attributes for the spiritual advancement of others.

Meher Baba calls people who are in the third state Perfect Masters or Mukammil. He distinguishes the second state from Perfect Masters, calling them instead "Perfect Ones" or Kamil. One of the aspects that he says demarcates the Perfect Master from the Perfect One is that the Perfect Master has disciples, while the Perfect One does not. Also Baba says that a Perfect Master can make like himself any number of souls or even the whole of creation, while the Perfect One can only make one soul like himself. However, Meher Baba makes it clear in his system as outlined in God Speaks that the consciousness of these souls is absolutely One and the same. To explain this apparent contradiction he likens the difference between these two classifications of God realized souls to a difference in the 'office' of the God Realized person.

Meher Baba says that at all times on Earth there are 56 incarnate God-realized souls, but that of these only five are deemed the five Perfect Masters of their era. When one of the five Perfect Masters "drops" his physical body, Baba says, another God-realized soul among the 56 incarnate at that time replaces him by taking up that office in that moment. Thus, Meher Baba says there are 56 God-realized souls on Earth at all times, but only and exactly five hold the office of Perfect Master.

In addition, Baba says there is one very rare type of God-realized person who has no disciples but who has duties included in his office. These he says are called Most Perfect Ones or Akmal.

The Five Perfect Masters 

Meher Baba is unique among Indian teachers in that he said that the number of Perfect Masters on the Earth is exactly five at all times. He said further that at the time of his own God-realization the five Perfect Masters were Sai Baba of Shirdi, Upasni Maharaj, Hazrat Babajan, Hazrat Tajuddin Baba and Narayan Maharaj and that these five brought him down to human consciousness as the Avatar on Earth in this cycle of time. "During the Avataric period,
the five Perfect Masters make God incarnate as man." He also said, "What I am, what I was, and what I will be as the Ancient One is always due to the five Perfect Masters of the Age. Sai Baba, Upasni Maharaj, Babajan, Tajuddin Baba and Narayan Maharaj - these are the five Perfect Masters of this age for me." All of these have since died and Meher Baba did not say who their replacements were, except to indicate that for the time being they will be in the East. He further indicated that although the 'offices' of the five Perfect Masters are always filled, when they drop their bodies they 'also shed forever their Subtle and Mental vehicles and pass away utterly as God, retaining infinite Individuality and experiencing the Infinite Power, Knowledge and Bliss'.

Meher Baba also said that while there are numerous planets in the Universe with human life on them, Earth is the only planet where God realization is possible and where the five Perfect Masters take birth.

The Avatar 

Meher Baba asserts that beyond the five Perfect Masters of the age, (distinguished as those God-realized souls which fulfill the office of Perfect Master temporarily until they drop their physical bodies), there is also the Avatar. "The number of God-Realized souls on earth is eternally fixed at fifty-six and is never altered, except during Avataric ages when God directly descends as a man." The Avatar, according to Meher Baba, is a special Perfect Master who was the original Perfect Master, or the Ancient One, who never ceases to incarnate in spite of his original attainment of God-realization. Baba says that this particular soul personifies the preserver or sustainer state of God which in Hinduism is called Vishnu and in Sufism is called Parvardigar. According to Meher Baba the Avatar appears on Earth every 700–1400 years, and is brought down into human form by the five Perfect Masters of that age to aid in the process of moving creation in its never-ending journey toward Godhood. He said that in other ages this role was fulfilled by Zoroaster, Rama, Krishna, Gautama Buddha, Jesus, and lastly by Muhammad. "Of the most recognized and much worshiped manifestations of God as Avatar, that of Zarathustra is the earliest – having been before Ram, Krishna, Buddha, Jesus and Muhammad."

Majzoob 

Besides Perfect One (Kamil), Most Perfect One (Akmal), and Perfect Master (Mukammil), Meher Baba described one other type of incarnate soul that has transcended the finite ego and merged in a state of God-consciousness, but cannot help others. This type is the Majzoob (Arabic: Absorbed). Unlike the Perfect Master, or any of the other sub-types of God-realized souls, the Majzoob is absorbed in God to such a degree that he cannot be of any direct assistance to anyone else in creation though he can be of indirect help to those who honor him. This is because he is a perfect mast and as such has no experience of the external physical or internal mental worlds. According to Meher Baba the Majzoob has no experience of the gross, subtle, or mental worlds, but is entirely absorbed in the bliss of his state of Godhood.

See also 

 Satguru
 Jivanmukta
 Qutub (Sufism)

References

External links 
 Meher Baba on Perfect Masters
 The Five Perfect Masters of Meher Baba at YouTube.

Meher Baba